Asifa Akhtar is a Pakistani biologist who has made significant contributions to the field of chromosome regulation. She is Senior Group Leader and Director of the Department of Chromatin Regulation at the Max Planck Institute of Immunobiology and Epigenetics.  Akhtar was awarded EMBO membership in 2013. She became the first international and female Vice President of the Max Planck Society's Biology and Medicine Section in July 2020.

Academic career 
Originally from Karachi, Pakistan, Asifa Akhtar studied for a BSc in biology at University College London, moving to the Imperial Cancer Research Fund (now part of the Francis Crick Institute) to gain a PhD for studying transcriptional regulation in the lab of Richard Treisman. Akhtar's postdoctoral studies in chromatin regulation were carried out in Peter Becker’s lab Germany, at European Molecular Biology Laboratory (EMBL), Heidelberg and the Adolf Butenandt Institute, Munich. Akhtar became a group leader at EMBL in 2001, moving to the Max Planck Institute of Immunobiology and Epigenetics, Freiburg in 2009, where she heads the Akhtar lab. Akhtar is an editor of the Journal of Cell Science. On July 1, 2020, she was elected Vice President of the Max Planck Society's Biology and Medicine Section.

Research interests 
Asifa Akhtar's research focus is the study of chromatin and epigenetic mechanisms. Using Drosophila melanogaster as an experimental model, Akhtar investigates how dosage compensation acts in regulation of the X chromosome. Studies have also focused on how the nuclear RNA helicase, DHX9, protects the genome from deleterious effects of transposon insertion. More recently Akhtar has investigated how transcription fidelity is affected by changes in the nucleosome landscape.

Awards and honours 

 2008 Akhtar was the recipient of the early career European Life Science Organization Award.
 2013 Akhtar was awarded EMBO membership.
 2017 Akhtar was awarded the Feldberg Prize.
 2021 Akhtar was awarded the Leibniz Prize.
 In 2019 she became a member of the German Academy of Sciences Leopoldina.

References

External links 

 Asifa Akhtar the Max Planck Institute of Immunobiology and Epigenetics.

Alumni of University College London
Members of the European Molecular Biology Organization
Max Planck Institute directors
21st-century Pakistani scientists
Pakistani women scientists
Epigeneticists
Year of birth missing (living people)
Living people
Women geneticists
Francis Crick Institute alumni
Pakistani geneticists
Members of the German Academy of Sciences Leopoldina